Jaime Zapata (1978 –2011) was a U.S. ICE agent, killed in Mexico.

Jaime Zapata may also refer to:

Jaime Zapata (painter) (born 1957), Ecuadorian painter
Jaime Zapata (Labor Department spokesman) (born 1962), American businessman and former U.S. Department of Labor official